The Nightmare Worlds of H. G. Wells is a 2016 horror-fantasy television miniseries, based on short stories by H. G. Wells. The four-part series of 23-minute episodes was commissioned broadcast by Sky Arts.

Plot 
Every episode opens (and closes) with Wells, who introduces a topic and narrated a story about it.

Episode 1: The Late Mr. Elvesham 
Young and penniless medical student Edward Eden is approached by old and wealthy Egbert Elvesham, who doesn't have an heir and is looking for somebody to inherits his fortune, provided they take his name. However, Elvesham tricks Eden into drinking a potion which makes them exchange their bodies during the night. While Elvesham enjoys the joys of the young body, Eden is trapped in the old body (and in the identity of its previous owner), and looks for his revenge.

Episode 2: The Devotee of Art 
Mediocre artist Alec Harringay is trying to depict St. Catherine for a submission to the Royal Academy but he is never satisfied with his work. His painting becomes suddenly alive and lures him into a dreadful pact: being able to paint a masterpiece in exchange of his soul. This event radically transforms Harringay, who eventually kills his wife Isabel and suffer the consequences.

Episode 3: The Moth 
Entomologists Prof. Pawkins and Dr. Hapley take pleasure in discrediting each other's work. When Pawkins dies, Hapley loses interest in his research, and shortly after he is haunted by a moth with the face of his old enemy. He becomes obsessed that the moth is actually a reincarnated Hapley taking revenge, but he is not believed and is deemed crazy.

Episode 4: The Purple Pileus 
Shopkeeper James Coombes constantly argues with his wife Eveline and her friends Jennie and Clarence. When things become too tense, he wanders outside, first meditating how to kill her, then choosing to kill himself, by eating what he believes are poisonous purple mushrooms. However, they are revealed to be hallucinogenic: after an overdose, he starts consuming a calibrated amount to improve his humour in daily life. Eventually, Eveline eats all the mushrooms by mistake, overdosing herself with dreadful consequences.

Cast 
Ray Winstone - H. G. Wells

Episode 1 
Camilla Beeput - Young Woman

Graham Duff - Doctor

Michael Gambon  - Egbert Elvesham

Paul Putner - Harris

Luke Treadaway - Edward Eden

Episode 2 
Brid Brennan - Nurse

Leticia Dolera - St. Catherine

Johnny Flynn - Alec Harringay

Antonia Thomas - Isabel Harringay

Episode 3 
Amelda Brown - Hapley's Housekeeper

Tom Goodman-Hill - Father Morton

Rupert Graves - Dr. Hapley

James Wilby - Professor Pawkins

Episode 4 
Leanne Best - Eveline Coombes

Mercedes Grower - Jennie

Shaun Parkes - James Coombes

Stewart Wright - Clarence Clint

Production
Wells wrote the script of an abandoned film version of Mr Elvesham (as The New Faust) for Alexander Korda in the 1930s. Filming for the series took place at West London Film Studios. Writer and executive producer Graham Duff also appeared in the first episode.

Episodes

See also 
 The Infinite Worlds of H. G. Wells - a similar 2001 anthology
 H. G. Wells bibliography

References

External links
 
 The Nightmare Worlds of H. G. Wells at FilmAffinity

2016 British television series debuts
2016 British television series endings
Cultural depictions of H. G. Wells
British fantasy television series
Adaptations of works by H. G. Wells
Television series by Clerkenwell Films